Presidential elections were held in the West Bank and Gaza Strip of the Palestinian National Authority on Sunday, 9 January 2005 to elect the President of the Palestinian National Authority, to succeed Yasser Arafat, who had died on 11 November 2004. The election was the first to be held since the 1996 general election, and voters elected Palestine Liberation Organization chairman Mahmoud Abbas for a four-year term.

Seven candidates contested the election. Abbas won over 67% of the votes cast, independent candidate Mustafa Barghouti came second with 21%, and the remaining candidates were far behind. The election was boycotted by Hamas and Islamic Jihad. Hamas urged supporters to stay away, but did not try to disrupt the election. In the Gaza Strip, where Hamas is strongest, it is estimated that about half of the eligible voters voted.

No presidential elections have taken place since 2005. Abbas has continued in office since the expiration of the four-year term on 9 January 2009, with planned elections repeatedly postponed.

Candidates
On 25 November 2004, Fatah's Revolutionary Council endorsed Mahmoud Abbas as its preferred candidate for the presidential election, scheduled for 9 January 2005, despite his relative lack of popular appeal. Abbas was a former PA Prime Minister.

Marwan Barghouti, a member of the Palestinian Legislative Council and Fatah leader in the West Bank, who was in an Israeli prison after being convicted for a number of intifada killings, suggested that he might run, inspiring considerable speculation about his prospects. He was seen as the only candidate who could hope to compete seriously against Abbas. However, his proposed candidacy met with resistance from Fatah activists. After contradictory announcements, Marwan Barghouti declared his candidacy just before the registration deadline expired but then withdrew from the race on 12 December, after discussions between his representatives and the Fatah leadership. Opinion polls before Marwan Barghouti withdrew his candidacy suggested that the contest would largely be between Abbas and Marwan Barghouti. Some of these polls showed:

 Abbas 44% / Marwan Barghouti 46% (±3%) (Development Studies Program, Bir Zeit University)
 Abbas 40% / Marwan Barghouti 38% (±3%) (Palestinian Center for Policy and Survey Research)
 Abbas 40% / Marwan Barghouti 22% (±3%) (Palestinian Center for Public Opinion).

With Marwan Barghouti's withdrawal, Abbas was seen as the clear favourite, with Marwan Barghouti‘s cousin Mustafa Barghouti in second place.

Final list of candidates
 Mahmoud Abbas - Palestine Liberation Organisation. Former Prime Minister and current chairman of the PLO, endorsed by the Fatah Revolutionary Council on November 25, 2004.
 Abelhaleem Hasan Abdelraziq Ashqar - independent.
 Sayyid Barakah - independent.
 Mustafa Barghouti - independent. A democracy activist and head of the Palestinian National Initiative. His candidacy was supported by the Popular Front for the Liberation of Palestine. Not to be confused with his cousin Marwan Barghouti.
 Taysir Khalid - Democratic Front for the Liberation of Palestine
 Bassam al-Salhi - Palestinian People's Party
 Abdel Karim Shubeir - independent

Three other candidates who registered by the end of the registration period subsequently withdrew: they were Marwan Barghouti, Hassan Khreisheh and Abd al-Sattar Qasim.

Registration

Preparation of voting register
The CEC had made enormous efforts to register all eligible Palestinian voters, but almost a third of eligible voters did not register or were unable to register. Problems were due to a not up to date civil registry and the translation of Arabic names, which were in Hebrew on Israeli ID cards. In an effort to boost low turnout, the CEC made a controversial decision in the final hours of polling day to allow unregistered voters to cast ballots using only their identity cards, which raised fears of multiple voting.  A Palestinian election official, speaking on condition of anonymity, told the Associated Press that the changes came after heavy pressure from Mahmoud Abbas' Fatah movement, which feared a low turnout could weaken Abbas. ("Abbas Wins Palestinian Vote in Landslide," Associated Press, 10 January 2005).

The day before the election the total number of registered voters was 1,092,407 according to a CEC press release.  On 23 November, the CEC said: "The number of registrants on the voters’ list reached 1,111,868, or 67 percent of the estimated number of eligible voters, during the registration process conducted between September 4 and October 13, 2004. Of these names, 19,000 were removed from the voters’ list because the accompanying data was incomplete or the names were repeated on the list. With this adjustment, the number of registered voters decreased to 1,092,856." ("46% of Registered Voters are Youths, 46% are Women.")

Palestinian diaspora
According to UNRWA, there were 2.6 million Palestinians registered as refugees with the agency eligible to receive services who lived outside Palestine, in Jordan, Lebanon and Syria. An unknown additional number sometimes estimated to be up to one million live in the diaspora in Europe, North and South America and in other Arab countries.

Conduct
The election was conducted by the Palestinian Central Elections Commission (CEC), which was also responsible for the preparation of an electoral register. The head of the CEC was Hanna Nasir, who was appointed in 2002 by Yasser Arafat. The CEC was established by the Palestinian Authority in 1995 as an independent body.

The CEC experienced some technical problems, including those due to the incomplete electoral register. Persons not listed on the electoral register were permitted to vote on presentation of a valid identity card. In view of the registration problems, in an effort to boost low turnout, in the final hours of polling day the CEC was controversially instructed to extend voting by two hours beyond the appointed closing time to allow unregistered voters to cast ballots using only their identity cards. The decision raised fears of multiple voting.

The election was observed by a number of international observers, including former President Jimmy Carter and U.S. Senators Joe Biden and John E. Sununu.

Obstruction by Israel
The election campaign faced problems due to the widespread blockade of the Palestinian territories by the Israel Defense Forces. Despite Israel's assurances that it would do what it could to ensure that the election took place, in many instances Israeli forces actively interfered in the campaign. Among reported incidents was the arrest of Mustafa Barghouti by Israeli forces and his subsequent expulsion from East Jerusalem when he was going to hold an election speech there. He was also prevented from entering Nablus and Gaza. Bassam al-Salhi, candidate for the socialist Palestinian People's Party, was also prevented from visiting East Jerusalem. Many of Abbas' opponents claimed that they were unfairly treated as Israel denied them entry to areas Abbas was allowed to visit during the election campaign. Abbas was the only candidate allowed access to Gaza.

Voter registration was hampered by closure of registration centers due to curfews, roadblocks and road closures. Registration staff and supervisors were detained. Israeli troops, used gas grenades and noise in the vicinity. A number of centers were raided.

Particularly East Jerusalem was affected. Checking of the names of voters in the voters list was prevented. Also the polling was supervised by the Israeli postal authority. The votes were not counted at the polling centers themselves, but first transported to the Jerusalem electoral constituency office in Dahiyat al-Barid.
 Voters were intimidated by recording the ID card numbers that were listed in the register and registration staff members were detained.

There were difficulties in accessing polling stations. In Khan Younis Israeli soldiers opened fire against a school used as a polling station and by roadblocks prevented thousands of people from getting to the polling stations.

The European Union's foreign policy chief Javier Solana criticized Israel for obstructing the Palestinian presidential election. He was quoted as saying that "We expected the Israelis to offer more facilities for the Palestinian election process but they did not live up to promises."

Results
Mahmoud Abbas won the election with over 67% of the votes cast.

International response
The EU praised the election, with European Commission president José Manuel Durão Barroso describing it as "a very important step towards the creation of a viable and democratic Palestinian state".

References

External links
Central Elections Commission (CEC)
News reports from IMEMC about the election
Angus Reid Consultants - Election Tracker

Palestine
Elections in the Palestinian National Authority
2005 in the Palestinian territories